Vasily Stepanov was a Russian film actor.

Selected filmography 
 1909 — 16th Century Russian Wedding
 1910 — The Water Nymph
 1912 — The Bandit Brothers

References

External links 
 ВАСИЛИЙ СТЕПАНОВ on kino-teatr.ru

Russian male film actors
20th-century Russian male actors